Norweb, originally the North Western Electricity Board, was a British electricity supply and distribution company. It supplied electricity to about 4.7 million industrial, commercial and domestic customers in the North West of England, although Merseyside and parts of Cheshire were instead covered by Manweb.

History

Nationalised industry
The board was originally formed in 1948, as part of the nationalisation of the electricity industry by the Electricity Act 1947. The board was responsible for the purchase of electricity from the electricity generator (the Central Electricity Generating Board from 1958) and its distribution and sale to customers. The key people on the board were: Chairman R. F. Richardson (1964, 1967), Deputy Chairman F. Linley (1964, 1967), full-time member  J. W. K. Evans (1967).

The total number of customers supplied by the board was as follows:

The amount of electricity, in GWh, sold by Norweb was:

Post privatisation

The assets of the board passed to Norweb plc in July 1990, which was privatised in a stock market flotation later in the same year.

Norweb was acquired by North West Water in October 1995 for £1.83 billion. The combined water and electricity companies became United Utilities (UU). The customer base for the electricity supply arm was subsequently sold off in March 2000 to TXU Corporation, as Norweb Energi. TXU was itself acquired by Powergen in October 2002.

The value electrical retailing arm Norweb Retail was sold to the Kingfisher Group in November 1996 for £51 million; seeing the closure of the Bolton head office, the CAS distribution centre in Worsley, the flagship Coventry 285, 57 high street stores and half of its out of town superstores. Remaining stores were rebranded under the name Comet.

UU retained the remainder of the company, including the distribution network in the northwest of England, as Norweb Distribution. In November 2001, Norweb was renamed United Utilities Electricity.

The company was the licensed distribution network operator for the North West England, until its sale in December 2007 to North West Electricity Networks, a joint venture between Colonial First State and JPMorgan Chase. Electricity North West became the licensed distribution network operator for the North West of England, as a consequence of the sale.

Headquarters
A new headquarters building for the board was built in 1963 on the site of the Dickinson Street power station in Manchester. The architects of this steel-framed building were Harry S. Fairhurst & Son. The project required the draining and infilling of an arm of the Rochdale Canal. The staircases, lifts and cloakrooms are in the eastern wing, separate from the offices.

Cultural references
English Rugby league team Wigan Warriors had Norweb as their primary shirt sponsor between 1988 and 1999 (as TXU Energi between 1998 and 1999). This period saw Wigan win many trophies (including 7 of their 8 record consecutive Challenge Cup Final wins), (7 successive League titles between 1990 and 1996), (5 John Player Special/Regal Trophy wins between 1989 and 1996 out of 6 final appearances), (5 Premiership wins between 1992 and 1997 out of 6 final appearances), (2 Lancashire Cups in 1988 and 1992), (2 World Club Championships in 1991 and 1994 out of 3 appearances), (2 7s Tournaments World 7s in 1992 and Middlesex 7s in 1996), (2 Charity Shields in 1991 and 1995 out of 6 appearances), (The League Leaders Shield and Super League title in 1998 these 2 would be the last trophies that Wigan would win in the Norweb era) before the sponsorship ended in 1999,  with the Norweb brand gaining regular exposure on televised Rugby League due to Wigan's success over this time. Norweb also sponsored a tram named "The Power" on the Manchester Metrolink network (1026). Norweb's "The Power" advertising hoardings also featured prominently inside Manchester United's Old Trafford ground in the early 1990s.

Norweb was also referenced in Red Dwarf, which was originally produced in Manchester. Holly, the on board computer of the mining ship Red Dwarf, played a practical joke on Dave Lister. According to Holly, the Norweb Federation were looking for Lister for his crimes against humanity; leaving two half eaten sausages on his table before leaving, which over three million years had gone mouldy and now covered seven-eighths of the earth's surface.

Lister also owns 98% of all the planet Earth’s wealth due to £17.50 left in his bank account that was subject to compound interest and hoarded so nobody else had any money except Norweb, as Lister had left a light on in the bathroom. This all results in a final £180 billion demand from Lister before Holly reveals his gag.

Norweb is referenced in the Frank Sidebottom (aka Chris Sievey) song "Electricity" which is on his LP "5:9:88". In the song Frank (supposedly) loses his electricity bill down a drain and he sings "I remember thinking I should inform Norweb now..." He heads off the Norweb office to address the matter but window shops and arrives too late.

When Frank returns home his electricity is cut off and his mum sends him to his room. The song is rather detailed and specifically mentions the location of a Norweb office in George Street, Altrincham in the Borough of Trafford. Apparently Sievey had experience with his electricity being cut off and this song, perhaps, conveys a real life situation.

See also
Companies merged into North Western Electricity Board

References

Companies formerly listed on the London Stock Exchange
Defunct companies based in Manchester
Electric power companies of the United Kingdom
Former nationalised industries of the United Kingdom
Utilities of England
1948 establishments in England
1995 disestablishments in England